The following persons were Bishops of the Diocese of Oldenburg or Lübeck (until 1180), Prince-Bishops of the diocese of Lübeck and the Prince-Bishopric of Lübeck (1180–1535), Lutheran Administrators of the Prince-Bishopric of Lübeck without pastoral function, and pastoral chairmen of the Evangelical Lutheran State Church in the Region of Lübeck.

Titles of the incumbents of the Lübeck See 
Not all incumbents of the Lübeck See were imperially invested princely power as Prince-Bishops and not all were papally confirmed as bishops. In 1180 part of the Lübeck diocesan territory were disentangled from the Duchy of Saxony and became an own territory of imperial immediacy called Prince-Bishopric of Lübeck, a vassal of the Holy Roman Empire. The prince-bishopric was an elective monarchy, with the monarch being the respective bishop usually elected by the Lübeck cathedral chapter, and confirmed by the Holy See, or exceptionally only appointed by the Holy See. Papally confirmed bishops were then invested by the emperor with the princely regalia, thus the title prince-bishop. However, sometimes the respective incumbent of the see never gained a papal confirmation, but was still invested the princely regalia. Also the opposite occurred with a papally confirmed bishop, never invested as prince. A number of incumbents, elected by the chapter, neither achieved papal confirmation nor imperial investiture, but as a matter of fact nevertheless de facto held the princely power. The respective incumbents of the see bore the following titles:
 Bishop of Oldenburg (Aldinborg/Starigard) until 1160
 Bishop of Lübeck 1160–1180
 Prince-Bishop of Lübeck from 1180 to 1586, which the incumbents in 1535 and between 1561 and 1586 being de facto Lutherans
 Administrator of the Prince-Bishopric of Lübeck 1586 to 1803. Either simply de facto replacing the Prince-Bishop or lacking canon-law prerequisites the incumbent of the see would officially only hold the title administrator (but nevertheless colloquially referred to as Prince-Bishop). After 1648 (Peace of Westphalia) the Lutheran administrators were generally imperially accepted as holding the princely regalia.

Catholic Bishops of Oldenburg (Aldinborg/Starigard) till 1160

Catholic Bishops of Lübeck (1160–1180)

Catholic Prince-Bishops of Lübeck (1180–1535)

Catholic and Lutheran Prince-Bishops of Lübeck (1535–1586)

Lutheran Administrators of the Prince-Bishopric (1586–1803)

Chairperson of the Evangelical Lutheran State Church of Lübeck (Eutin) (1921–77)

Sources 
 Friedrich Wilhelm Ebeling, Die deutschen Bischöfe bis zum Ende des sechzehnten Jahrhunderts - Biographisch, literarisch, historisch und kirchenstatistisch dargestellt, vol. 1, Leipzig 1858, S. 562-589.
 Ernst Friedrich Mooyer, Verzeichnisse der deutschen Bischöfe seit dem Jahre 800 nach Chr. Geb., Minden 1854, S. 56-57.
 Hermann Grote, Stammtafeln, Leipzig 1877

Notes 

 List
Bishops
Lubeck